Corbère is a commune in the Pyrénées-Orientales department in southern France.

Geography

Localisation 
Corbère is located in the canton of La Vallée de la Têt and in the arrondissement of Perpignan.

History 
The hamlet of Corbère-les-Cabanes starts growing in population from the 16th century and on. In the 19th century, the territory is still part of the commune of Corbère. Yet, thinking it is now big enough, its people ask to become an independent commune from Corbère. This is finally done on May 14, 1856.

Population

See also
Communes of the Pyrénées-Orientales department
France

References

Communes of Pyrénées-Orientales